Imola is a village in Borsod-Abaúj-Zemplén county, Hungary. The village's name is derived from an extinct language called Ohmagyar. The name means "moss".

External links 
 Street map 

Populated places in Borsod-Abaúj-Zemplén County